The Danger Point is a 1922 American silent drama film directed by Lloyd Ingraham and starring Carmel Myers, William P. Carleton and Vernon Steele.

Cast
 Carmel Myers as Alice Torrance
 William P. Carleton as James Benton
 Vernon Steele as 	Duncan Phelps 
 Joseph J. Dowling as Banjamin
 Harry Todd as 	Sam Biggs
 Margaret Joslin as 	Elvira Hubbard

References

Bibliography
 Connelly, Robert B. The Silents: Silent Feature Films, 1910-36, Volume 40, Issue 2. December Press, 1998.
 Munden, Kenneth White. The American Film Institute Catalog of Motion Pictures Produced in the United States, Part 1. University of California Press, 1997.

External links
 

1922 films
1922 drama films
1920s English-language films
American silent feature films
Silent American drama films
Films directed by Lloyd Ingraham
American black-and-white films
1920s American films